Yusuf Parmar is former Deputy Mayor of Gandhinagar, India and a senior Indian National Congress politician.

See also
 Bharatiya Janata Party

References

Living people
People from Gandhinagar
Ahmedabad municipal councillors
Indian National Congress politicians
Year of birth missing (living people)
Indian National Congress politicians from Gujarat